The 2016 Women's European Water Polo Championship was held from 10 to 22 January 2016 in Belgrade, Serbia.

Hungary won their third title by defeating the Netherlands 9–7 in the final. Italy captured the bronze medal after a 10–9 win over Spain.

Qualification

Format
The twelve teams were split into two groups of six teams. The first four placed teams advance to the knockout stage, from which on a knockout-system will be used to determine the final positions.

Draw
The draw was held on 4 October 2015.

Squads

Preliminary round

Group A
All times are CET (UTC+1).

Group B
All times are CET (UTC+1).

Final round
Championship bracket

5th place bracket

Quarterfinals
All times are CET (UTC+1).

5th–8th place classification
All times are CET (UTC+1).

Semifinals
All times are CET (UTC+1).

11th place match
All times are CET (UTC+1).

9th place match
All times are CET (UTC+1).

7th place match
All times are CET (UTC+1).

5th place match
All times are CET (UTC+1).

Bronze medal match
All times are CET (UTC+1).

Gold medal match
All times are CET (UTC+1).

Final ranking

Team Roster
Edina Gangl, Dóra Czigány, Dóra Antal, Hanna Kisteleki, Gabriella Szűcs, Orsolya Takács, Anna Illés, Rita Keszthelyi (C), Ildikó Tóth, Barbara Bujka, Dóra Csabai, Krisztina Garda, Orsolya Kasó. Head coach: Attila Bíró

Awards and statistics

Top goalscorers

Source: wpbelgrade2016.microplustiming.com

Individual awards

Most Valuable Player

Best Goalkeeper

Top Scorer
 — 23 goals

References

External links
Official website

Women
2016
International water polo competitions hosted by Serbia
Women's water polo in Serbia
2016 in women's water polo
International sports competitions in Belgrade
2016 European Water Polo Championship,Women
Sport in Málaga
2016 in Serbian women's sport
January 2016 sports events in Europe